Oberdorfer is a surname. Notable people with the surname include:

Don Oberdorfer (born 1931), American journalist and academic
Erich Oberdorfer (1905–2002), German botanist
Louis F. Oberdorfer (1919–2013), American judge
Pauline Oberdorfer (1889–1963), was one of the founders of Delta Sigma Theta, Inc.